North West Delhi Lok Sabha constituency is one of the 7 Lok Sabha (parliamentary) constituencies in the Indian National Capital Territory of Delhi. This constituency came into existence in 2008 as a part of the implementation of the recommendations of the Delimitation Commission of India constituted in 2002. This constituency is reserved for the candidates belonging to the Scheduled castes.

Assembly segments
North West Delhi Lok Sabha constituency comprises the following Delhi Vidhan Sabha segments:

Members of Parliament
The North-West Delhi Lok Sabha constituency was created in 2009. The list of Member of Parliament (MP) is as follows:

Election results

17th Lok Sabha: 2019 General Elections

16th Lok Sabha: 2014 General Elections

15th Lok Sabha: 2009 General Elections

See also
 List of Constituencies of the Lok Sabha
 Outer Delhi (Lok Sabha constituency)

References

Lok Sabha constituencies in Delhi
North West Delhi district
2008 establishments in Delhi
Constituencies established in 2008